Daniela Schulte (born 30 June 1982 in Berlin) is a German Paralympic swimmer, competing in the S11 class. Having developed a genetically caused visual impairment aged nine, Schulte began to compete in swimming for competitors with a disability at the age of 13. A year later Schulte participated in the 1996 Summer Paralympics in Atlanta, winning gold medals with both the 4x100m freestyle and 4x100m medley relays B1-3 as well as two silver medals in the 100m freestyle and 200m individual medley B1 events. At the 2000 Summer Paralympics in Sydney, Schulte was able to add a silver medal in the 100m freestyle S11 to her tally.

In 2003 Schulte gave birth to twin boys. She returned to competition in 2007 and went on to win a bronze medal at the 2008 Summer Paralympics in Beijing. In 2012 she was chosen as the German flag bearer during the Opening Ceremony of the 2012 Summer Paralympics in London. During the Games Schulte won her first individual gold medal in the 400m freestyle S11 event and a silver medal in the 200m individual medley SM11.

In addition to her Paralympic honours, Schulte has also won 14 gold medals each at World and European Championships.

References

External links 
 
 

1982 births
Living people
Swimmers at the 2012 Summer Paralympics
Paralympic gold medalists for Germany
Paralympic swimmers of Germany
Swimmers from Berlin
Medalists at the 1996 Summer Paralympics
Medalists at the 2000 Summer Paralympics
Medalists at the 2008 Summer Paralympics
Medalists at the 2012 Summer Paralympics
Paralympic silver medalists for Germany
Paralympic bronze medalists for Germany
Swimmers at the 1996 Summer Paralympics
Swimmers at the 2000 Summer Paralympics
Swimmers at the 2008 Summer Paralympics
S11-classified Paralympic swimmers
Medalists at the World Para Swimming Championships
Medalists at the World Para Swimming European Championships
Paralympic medalists in swimming
Recipients of the Order of Merit of Berlin
German female freestyle swimmers
German female backstroke swimmers
German female breaststroke swimmers
German female butterfly swimmers
German female medley swimmers
20th-century German women
21st-century German women